Kingsley Lake is an almost perfectly circular lake of about  in North East Florida, is located inside Clay County about  east of Starke, Florida. According to some sources, it is the oldest and highest lake in Florida, located on the edge of the Trail Ridge formation. The lake is a very stable lake with a sandy bottom. Its deepest point is about  inside of a steep sinkhole within the lake. Kingsley Lake is so nearly circular that pilots call it the "silver dollar lake". There are around 180 docks around the lake, mostly around the western half of the lake encompassing the small community of the same name. Camp Blanding is on the eastern side of the lake as part of the Florida National Guard, as well as a small airstrip just to the southeast of the lake as part of Camp Blanding.  The lake is about 30 miles northeast of Gainesville, 30 miles southwest of Jacksonville, and 30 miles northwest of Palatka.

Geological formation

The lake is thought to have formed as a sinkhole.

See also 
 List of sinkholes of the United States

References

External links
Kingsley Lake Association - web site that discusses the lake, community, and events
History of the lake from the Kingsley Lake Association
Florida Lakewatch: Kingsley - lake water chemistry data
Fact page on the lake from the St. Johns River Water Management District
USGS Open-File Report 94-616 - seismic reflection surveys of Kingsley Lake
Kingsley Lake

Lakes of Florida
Lakes of Clay County, Florida
Landforms of Clay County, Florida
Sinkholes of Florida
Outstanding Florida Waters
Unincorporated communities in Clay County, Florida
Unincorporated communities in Florida